Cacoscelis marginata is a species of flea beetle in the family Chrysomelidae. It lives in Peru.

Subspecies
These two subspecies belong to the species Cacoscelis marginata:
 Cacoscelis marginata binotata Illiger, 1807
 Cacoscelis marginata marginata

References

External links

 

Alticini
Invertebrates of Peru
Beetles of South America